The 2018 Angelique Kerber tennis season officially began on 30 December 2017 with the start of the 2018 Hopman Cup. Angelique Kerber entered the season as the No. 21 ranked player in the world.

Year in detail

Early hard court season and Australian Open

Hopman Cup
Kerber began her season at the Hopman Cup paired with Alexander Zverev. At the group stage she defeated Elise Mertens, Genie Bouchard and Daria Gavrilova all in straight sets, helping Germany to reach the final at this tournament. At the final stage she defeated Belinda Bencic, but they lost at the doubles match in straight sets.

Sydney Open
Next tournament was the Sydney Open. She defeated Lucie Šafářová, despite being two match points in the second set, the no. 2 seed Venus Williams,
Dominika Cibulková, qualifier Camila Giorgi and Daria Gavrilova. In the final match she faced Ashleigh Barty and went to win the title, defeating her 6–4, 6–4, claiming her first title since 2016 US Open.

Australian Open
Her next tournament was the Australian Open. She was 21st seed. She defeated Anna-Lena Friedsam in straight sets. She then beat Donna Vekic, the former Australian Open champion and the world no.1 Maria Sharapova in straight sets. She went on to defeat Hsieh Su-Wei in the 4th round in three sets and former world No. 7 Madison Keys in the quarter-finals, in straight sets. She faced the world No. 1 Simona Halep in the semi-finals. In the 3rd set she saved 3 match points. However, she felt down at the 9–7. After Australian Open, she returned to top ten.

Qatar Total Open
Kerber then played the Qatar Open, where she received a bye in the opening round. At the second and third round she defeated Samantha Stosur and Johanna Konta respectively. In quarterfinals, she faced the no. 1 seed Caroline Wozniacki, whom she lost in three sets.

All matches

Singles matches

Hopman Cup

Singles

Mixed doubles

Tournament schedule

Singles schedule
Kerber's 2018 singles tournament schedule is as follows:

Yearly records

Top 10 wins

Finals

Singles: 2 (2 titles)

Team competitions: 1 (1 runner-up)

See also

 2018 WTA Tour
 2018 Caroline Wozniacki tennis season
 2018 Simona Halep tennis season
 Angelique Kerber career statistics

Notes

References

External links

 Official website 
 Angelique Kerber at the Women's Tennis Association
 Angelique Kerber at the International Tennis Federation
 Angelique Kerber at the Fed Cup
 Angelique Kerber at the International Olympic Committee

Angelique Kerber tennis seasons
Kerber
Kerber